Lycinus is a genus of spider in the family Pycnothelidae, found in parts of South America.

Species
, the World Spider Catalog accepted 14 species:

Lycinus bonariensis (Mello-Leitão, 1938) – Argentina
Lycinus caldera Goloboff, 1995 – Chile
Lycinus choros Lucas & Indicatti, 2010 – Chile
Lycinus domeyko Goloboff, 1995 – Chile
Lycinus epipiptus (Zapfe, 1963) – Chile, Argentina
Lycinus frayjorge Goloboff, 1995 – Chile
Lycinus gajardoi (Mello-Leitão, 1940) – Chile
Lycinus lagigliai Ferretti, 2015 – Argentina
Lycinus longipes Thorell, 1894 (type species) – Argentina
Lycinus nevadoensis Ferretti, 2015 – Argentina
Lycinus ornatus (Tullgren, 1905) – Argentina
Lycinus portoseguro Lucas & Indicatti, 2010 – Brazil
Lycinus quilicura Goloboff, 1995 – Chile
Lycinus tofo Goloboff, 1995 – Chile

References

Pycnothelidae
Mygalomorphae genera
Spiders of South America